Lonsdale Quay Market is a major public market and tourist destination located in the city of North Vancouver, British Columbia, Canada. The market is located at the foot of Lonsdale Avenue and is adjacent to the Lonsdale Quay SeaBus terminal and transit exchange that serves Metro Vancouver's North Shore municipalities. The headquarters for the Insurance Corporation of British Columbia is located in a neighbouring building.

History
The marketplace opened just prior to Expo 86 on April 12, 1986, and features over 80 tenants, including food retailers, restaurants, retail shops, artisans and a boutique hotel. The quay was built on the former site of North Van Ship Repair, a major shipyard during World War II. In the 2010s, the quay area became the site of intensive construction of housing developments, backed by Mayor Darrell Mussatto.

References

External links
 Lonsdale Quay Market & Shops
 Pictures of Lonsdale Quay

Busking venues
Buildings and structures in Greater Vancouver
North Vancouver (city)
Tourism in British Columbia
Shopping malls in Metro Vancouver
Retail markets in Canada
Shopping districts and streets in Canada